Freddy Elías Góndola Smith, known as El Tanque (born 18 September 1995) is a Panamanian football player. He plays for Liga Deportiva Alajuelense

International career
He made his debut for the Panama national football team on 7 October 2021 in a World Cup qualifier against El Salvador.

International goals

References

External links
 
 

1995 births
Sportspeople from Panama City
Living people
Panamanian footballers
Panama international footballers
Association football forwards
Belén F.C. players
La Piedad footballers
Unión Deportivo Universitario players
Tauro F.C. players
Yaracuyanos FC players
Deportivo Táchira F.C. players
Liga FPD players
Liga Panameña de Fútbol players
Venezuelan Primera División players
Panamanian expatriate footballers
Expatriate footballers in Costa Rica
Panamanian expatriate sportspeople in Costa Rica
Expatriate footballers in Mexico
Panamanian expatriate sportspeople in Mexico
Expatriate footballers in Venezuela
Panamanian expatriate sportspeople in Venezuela